Clarendon Palace is a medieval ruin  east of Salisbury in Wiltshire, England. The palace was a royal residence during the Middle Ages, and was the location of the Assize of Clarendon which developed the Constitutions of Clarendon. It now lies within the grounds of Clarendon Park.

Roman era
There is evidence that the Romans used Clarendon Forest on a regular basis. Archaeological finds suggest that the area was relatively densely populated in the Roman period.

Hunting lodge
Clarendon Forest was probably in use as a royal hunting ground in the late Saxon period. It is also documented that the area was sometimes used as a military gathering-place from 1070 onwards. The name Clarendon is first recorded in 1164, and may derive from an Old English form *Claringa dūn, meaning "hill associated with Clare". A person named Clare is recorded as a witness in a charter dating from the reign of King Eadred.

The Norman kings also visited it, and the park was probably formally defined with deer leaps in the early 12th century by Henry I. Within its boundaries, the park was laid out with lawns, coppices, meadows and wood-pasture. By 1130 a hunting lodge existed within the park.

Residence and palace
Both Henry II and Henry III invested heavily in the property and converted it into a royal residence and palace. Considerable building work took place in the early-to-mid 13th century, including the construction of King's Chapel and the Antioch chamber under the supervision of Elias of Dereham, the ecclesiastical administrator who also oversaw the building of Salisbury Cathedral.

In 1164, Henry II framed the Constitutions of Clarendon here, which attempted to restrict ecclesiastical privileges and place limits on Papal authority in England. A memorial erected on the site in 1844 stated: 

At its height, the palace consisted of several buildings surrounding a central courtyard and contained inside a small wall.

Margaret Howell writes:

It was in 1453 at Clarendon Palace that King Henry VI first started to show signs of insanity. Usage of the Palace declined and by 1500 the building was no longer being maintained, and in 1574 it was described as a simple hunting lodge. In that year, Elizabeth I visited the site, but the buildings were in such poor condition that she had to dine in a temporary "banquett house".

Confiscation and decay
In 1649 the execution of Charles I resulted in the confiscation of Clarendon Palace by Parliament. Following the restoration of Charles II in 1660, the park passed briefly into the hands of George Monck, and then in 1664 to Edward Hyde, who (apparently in anticipation of acquiring the estate) had already, in 1661, taken the title Earl of Clarendon.

A new mansion, Clarendon Park, was built in a classical design elsewhere in the park in the early 18th century. Abandoned, Clarendon Palace deteriorated, and by the 18th century the ruins survived only as a romantic "eye-catcher" in the landscape, and as simple farm buildings. Nikolaus Pevsner wrote in 1963:

A series of campaigns of archaeological excavation were undertaken at the site between 1933 and 1939 by the Finnish art historian Tancred Borenius. Further excavations were carried out in 1957, 1964, 1965 and in the 1970s and 1980s. A tile-kiln discovered on the site has been reconstructed and is now at the British Museum.

All that is visible now above ground level is the one end wall of the Great Hall. The site is a scheduled monument.

References

Bibliography

External links

 English Heritage PastScape listing
 Friends of Clarendon Palace

1130 establishments in England
Buildings and structures completed in 1130
Houses completed in the 12th century
Ruins in Wiltshire
Archaeological sites in Wiltshire
Royal residences in England
Palaces in England
Former palaces in England
Ruined palaces
Scheduled monuments in Wiltshire
Henry I of England
Henry II of England
George Monck, 1st Duke of Albemarle